The Act for the relief of Indian Slaves and Prisoners, which was passed on March 7, 1852 in the Utah Territory, dealt with Indian slavery.  A similar law, the Act in Relation to Service, which had made slavery legal in the territory, had been passed on February 4, 1852.

Background

Although illegal throughout Mexico, the Indian slave trade was well-established when the Mormon pioneers arrived in Utah. At the encouragement of Mormon leaders, the Mormon pioneers began buying Indian slaves. They also acquired other prisoners through wars such as Battle at Fort Utah. At the end of the Mexican–American War, Utah became a part of the United States, and the issue of slavery in the new territories became a highly-political subject. Finally, Congress passed the Compromise of 1850, which allowed the Territories of Utah and New Mexico to choose by popular sovereignty whether to make slavery legal in those territories. Brigham Young began seeking to stop the Mexican slave trade but to encourage the local market, and he notified the Mexicans.

Many of Walker's Band were upset by the interruption with the Mexican slave trade. In one graphic incident, Ute Indian Chief Arrapine, a brother of Chief Walkara, insisted that because the Mormons had stopped the Mexicans from buying the children, the Mormons were obligated to purchase them. In his book, Forty Years Among the Indians, Daniel Jones wrote, "Several of us were present when he took one of these children by the heels and dashed its brains out on the hard ground, after which he threw the body towards us, telling us we had no hearts, or we would have bought it and saved its life."

In 1851, Don Pedro Leon Lujan, who had been trading slaves with a New Mexico license, sought a Utah license from Brigham Young but was refused. Later, Lujan was discovered with Indian slaves and charged with trading with Indians without a license. The trial was in progress, and the ambiguous status of slavery had become an issue during the trial.

Motives 
The Mormons were not opposed to using the slaves for their own purposes, but they opposed the harsh conditions of Mexican slavery.

On January 5, 1852, Brigham Young addressed the joint session of the Utah Territory legislature. He discussed the ongoing trial of Don Pedro Leon Lujan and the importance of explicitly indicating the true policy for slavery in Utah. He explained that although he did not think people should be treated as property, he felt that Indians were so low and degraded that transferring them to "the more favored portions of the human race" would be a benefit and relief. He argued that it was proper for persons thus purchased to owe a debt to the man or woman who saved them, and that it was "necessary that some law should provide for the suitable regulations under which all such indebtedness should be defrayed." He said that was superior to drudgery of Mexican slavery, because the Mexicans were "scarcely superior" to the Indians. He argued that type of service was necessary and honorable to improve the condition of Indians.

Details 
The Legislative Assembly of the Territory of Utah legalized slavery in February 1852 and dealt with Indian slavery in March 1852. The act was divided into four sections.

The first section required an Indian slave to be in possession of a white person and to be a prisoner, woman, or child. The prospective slave owner would bring the slave to the probate judge, who was then required to verify the slave owner was "properly qualified to raise or retain said Indian." If approved, the slave was then bound for up to twenty years, which could be renewed.

The second section mandated the probate officer to record the slave's name, age, place of birth, name of parents, tribe, name of slave owner, name of slave trader, and date of being bound.

The third section gave the probate officer power to obtain additional Indian prisoners and find slave owners for them.

The fourth section required the master to send children between the ages of seven and sixteen years to school for a period of three months each year if a school was available. Masters were also required to clothe them "in a comfortable and becoming manner, according to his, said master’s, condition in life." Masters were answerable to the probate judge for the treatment of these slaves.

The total education requirement was significantly greater than for blacks and slightly less than white indentured servants, whose masters were required to send them to school at age six.

Effects 
As a result of the act, many Mormon families took small Indian children into their homes to protect them from Mexican slavery or from being left destitute. John D. Lee, for example, wrote in his journal about a group of Indians who "brought me two more girls for which I gave them two horses. I named the girls Annette and Elnora."

The act concerned the Republican Party, which had made anti-slavery one of the pillars of its platform. While considering appropriations for Utah Territory, US Representative Justin Smith Morrill criticized the Church of Jesus Christ of Latter-day Saints for its laws on Indian slavery. He said that the laws were unconcerned about the way the Indian slaves were captured and noted that the only requirement was fir the Indian to be owned by a white person through purchase or otherwise. He said that Utah was the only American government to enslave Indians and that state-sanctioned slavery was "a dreg placed at the bottom of the cup by Utah alone." The Republicans' abhorrence of slavery delayed Utah's entrance as a state into the Union.

In 1857, Representative Morrill estimated that there were 400 Indian slaves in Utah. Richard Kitchen has identified at least 400 Indian slaves taken into Mormon homes, but estimates are that even more.went unrecorded because of the high mortality rate of Indian slaves. Many of them tried to escape.

Similar acts 
On the following day, March 8, 1852, the Act in relation to the assembling of Indians was passed, which prohibited the assembling of Indians near white settlements.

See also
Slavery among Native Americans in the United States
Utah in the American Civil War
Slave Trade Acts
History of slavery in Utah
Mormonism and slavery

References

 

1852 in American law
Mormonism and Native Americans
Repealed United States legislation
United States slavery law
Utah law
1852 in Utah Territory
Slavery of Native Americans
History of slavery in Utah
Mormonism and law